Cyrtodactylus badenensis is a gecko from Indochina, particularly South Vietnam.

Description
This species can be distinguished by its enlarged femoral scales and its absence of femoral pores; 8-10 lower labials, 10–13 upper labials, 2 internasal scales; 18-22 subdigital lamellaes on its fourth toe of its hindlimb; and about 25-28 scale rows around its midbody.

References

Further reading
Van Tri, Ngo, and Chan Kin Onn. "A new karstic cave-dwelling Cyrtodactylus Gray (Squamata: Gekkonidae) from northern Vietnam." Zootaxa 3125 (2011): 51–63.
Hoang, X. Q., et al. "Description of a new species of the genus Cyrtodactylus Gray, 1827 (Squamata: Sauria: Gekkonidae) from the karst of north central Vietnam." Russian Journal of Herpetology 14.2 (2007): 98–106.
Van Tri, Ngo, LLEE GRISMER, and Jesse L. Grismer. "A new endemic cave dwelling species of Cyrtodactylus Gray, 1827 (Squamata: Gekkonidae) in Kien Giang Biosphere Reserve, Southwestern Vietnam." Zootaxa 53.62 (1967): 2008.

Cyrtodactylus
Reptiles of Vietnam
Endemic fauna of Vietnam
Reptiles described in 2006